Amarjit Singh Samra was an Indian politician and a member of Indian National Congress. He was Minister for Revenue and Rehabilitation in the Punjab Government from 2002 to 2007.

Early life

He was born on 24 November 1943 in Samrai near Jalandhar in Punjab, India. His father's name is Ujagar Singh Samra.

Political career

Samra started his career as a sarpanch of Samrai in 1964. In 1975 he became chairman of development block or panchayat samiti Rurka Kalan. He remained sarpanch till 1993.  He was elected to the Punjab Legislative Assembly in 1994 in by election from Nakodar. He was re-elected in 1997, 2002 and 2007. In the 2002 Congress government he was made Minister for Revenue and Rehabilitation.

References

Shiromani Akali Dal politicians
Living people
Indian Sikhs
Punjab, India MLAs 1992–1997
Punjab, India MLAs 1997–2002
Punjab, India MLAs 2002–2007
Punjab, India MLAs 2007–2012
People from Jalandhar district
1943 births